Marion Township is a township in Douglas County, Kansas, USA.  As of the 2000 census, its population was 836.  It was named after the former town of Marion which in turn was named after Francis Marion.

Geography
According to the USGS, it contains five cemeteries: Appanoose, Colyer, Dodder, Rock Creek and Twin Mound.

Adjacent townships
Clinton Township, Douglas County (north)
Willow Springs, Douglas County (east)
Centropolis Township, Franklin County (southeast)
Appanoose Township, Franklin County (south)
Junction Township, Osage County (southwest)
Elk Township, Osage County (west)

Towns and settlements
Although these towns may not be incorporated or populated, they are still placed on maps produced by the county.

Globe, located at 
Lone Star, located at 
Twin Mound, located at

Transportation

Major highways
U.S. Highway 56

Places of interest

Lone Star Lake, about four and half miles south of Clinton Lake offers boating, fishing, camping and swimming during certain times of the year.
Simmons Point Station, an old stone house along the Santa Fe Trail that used to be a resting place and way station.
Townsite of Marion.  Located along U.S. Highway 56, the town was named for Francis Marion and was known as both Marion and Globe.
Townsite of Baden, located one mile (1.6 km) east of the Osage county line.
Twin Mound School, one of the best preserved one-room schoolhouses in the county and the last one to be consolidated in 1966.

References

External links
 City-Data.com

Townships in Douglas County, Kansas
Townships in Kansas